The Singapore Open Scrabble Championship is an international Scrabble tournament held each year in Singapore, established in 1998. The field of players is considerably large and it is not an invitational event. World Scrabble champion Nigel Richards has the most Singapore Open wins, with twelve between 2000 and 2017.

Champions
The winner of the championship's inaugural edition was Michael Tang in 1998. The player with the most Singapore Open victories is New Zealander Nigel Richards, who won eleven times between 2000 and 2014, and once again in 2016. No other person has won the tournament more than once. The Singapore Open was cancelled in 2013 and 2015 due to a lack of venue.

References

Scrabble competitions